Skua Island is a roughly triangular island  long, lying between Black Island to the southwest and Winter Island and Galindez Island to the north and northeast, in the Argentine Islands, Wilhelm Archipelago. Charted and named in 1935 by the British Graham Land Expedition (BGLE) under Rymill.

See also 
 List of Antarctic and sub-Antarctic islands

Islands of the Wilhelm Archipelago